Jachie-Pramso is a village in the Bosomtwe district, a district in the Ashanti Region of Ghana.

References

Populated places in the Ashanti Region